Holman v Johnson (1775) 1 Cowp 341 is an English contract law case, concerning the principles behind illegal transactions.

It is also possibly the first case in English law where the court explicitly recognised that aspects of a claim before the court might be adjudicated according to foreign law.

Facts
The claimant, who lived in Dunkirk, sold tea to the defendant. The claimant knew it was intended to be smuggled into England, though was not concerned with the smuggling scheme. The method of payment was meant to be by bills of exchange drawn in England. The claimant brought an action for non-payment, and the defendant contended that it could not be enforced because the contract was unlawful.

Judgment
Lord Mansfield CJ held that the agreement could be enforced because the seller had himself done nothing unlawful. He said the following.

In relation to the conflict of laws point, Mansfield added:

Significance
The decision was cited with approval by the House of Lords in Government of India v Taylor [1955] AC 491.

See also

English contract law

Notes

References

English contract case law
English conflict of laws case law
1775 in British law
1775 in case law
Court of King's Bench (England) cases
Lord Mansfield cases